The John Day River is a tributary of the Columbia River, approximately  long, in northwestern Oregon in the United States.

It passes under U.S. Route 30 near the unincorporated community of John Day (not to be confused with the city of the same name in Grant County). The John Day River has only one named tributary, Jack Creek, which enters from the left.

The river is named for John Day, a hunter and fur trapper who took part in William Price Hunt's overland expedition for John Jacob Astor in 1811–12. There's a John Day River in eastern Oregon, a John Day Dam, a city John Day, and John Day Fossil Beds National Monument, which were all named after John Day. John Day Point, a cape located at the mouth of the river and protruding into Cathlamet Bay, takes its name from the river, as did a former railway station in the vicinity. Lewis and Clark, who camped near here in 1805, referred to the river as Kekemarke, their version of a Native American name. Lewis and Clark write about the river in their journals. The river was known as Swan Creek by Charles Wilkes, of the U.S. Exploring Expedition and was documented as such on his illustrated map.

There's a railroad swing bridge crossing the mouth of the river. The tracks were used by Lewis and Clark Explorer Train which is no longer operating. The railroad bridge has a clearance of 8 feet.

Tidal currents control the river throughout most of its length. Moored houseboats cover some of the shorelines on both sides of the river.

Recreational activities 
The John Day River is open to boats, kayaks, and fishing. John Day County Park is 54 acres and the only public park along the John Day River. The boat launch is accessed off Oregon Highway 30. The boat launch puts users into the John Day River just before it enters the Columbia River, giving users access to both. The river can be accessed for about 3.5 miles upstream once you leave the boat ramp.

Marsh 
An uncommon tidal marsh exists along the John Day River. The Marsh is a little over 24 acres owned by North Coast Land Conservancy. The John Day River Marsh is part of the Columbia Quiet Waters initiative which covers the lower Columbia River swamp. The initiative includes a conservation plan to protect the Sitka spruce wetlands that are regarded as rare worldwide.

See also
Clatsop County, Oregon
Lists of rivers
List of rivers of Oregon
List of tributaries of the Columbia River
River
Riverboat

References

Rivers of Oregon
Rivers of Clatsop County, Oregon